Gainesville High School is located in Gainesville, Georgia, United States.

History
Gainesville High School was founded in 1892. It originally served White students only. In 1969, when court orders forced integration, the all-Black E. E. Butler High School was closed and its students rezoned to GHS.

Curriculum
Like the majority of comprehensive high schools in the US, GHS offers Advanced Placement and honors courses. In addition to Advanced Placement courses, Gainesville High School offers the AP Capstone program which gives students a chance at a second diploma by taking college level classes such as AP Seminar and AP Research.  It also offers vocational curricula.  In 2003 the school incorporated a formal Apprenticeship and Mentor Program to tech prep classes.

Recognition
Gainesville High School was awarded the National Blue Ribbon award for 2010. This is considered the highest honor an American school can achieve.
Gainesville High School has been recognized as a State School of Excellence.
In 2006, students Preston Smith, Robert Whelchel, and Bryan Williams were recognized for superior talent as winners of Southeast Regional Emmy Awards.
Under the guidance of Pam Ware, the drama department was honored as one of 50 high schools chosen to participate in the Fringe Festival in Edinburgh, Scotland in 2005, 2008, and 2011.
GHS has a tradition of Governors Honors participants and National Merit Scholar recipients, with test scores consistently in the top 10% in the state.

Athletics

GHS teams are known as the Red Elephants. They are the only school in the country with that mascot. They received the name in the 1920s when the well-known writer Grantland Rice decided to watch the final game of the undefeated 1925 Gainesville Red Elephants football team. Rice quipped "The team is coming on the field looking like a herd of "Red Elephants as the ground shakes beneath their feet". From 1923-25 The Red Elephants had a combined record of 26 wins and 0 losses {19 of those 26 wins came via shutout). They scored a combined 1045 points and allowed only 70 -SEASONS 23-25- (*The most dominant 3-year era for any team. *GHSA was not formed at the time and State Champions were not named.)'''
The Red Elephants football team won the State Championship in 2012 with Deshaun Watson (Current Cleveland Browns QB) leading the way.

Boys' golf teams 
Gainesville High School claims one of the most successful boys' golf programs in Georgia history. The program has won seven GHSA state championships (1978, 1979, 1981, 1994, 1996, 2012, and 2013).

Notable alumni

 Tommy Aaron, professional golfer
 Cris Carpenter, baseball player
 John Carroll, baseball player
 Damon Evans, administrator
 Michael Gettys, baseball player
 John Driskell Hopkins, musician
 Tasha Humphrey, basketball player
 A.J. Johnson, football player
 T.J. Jones, football player
 Jeremiah Ledbetter, football player
 Kendrick Lewis, football player
 Billy Lothridge, football player
 Billy Martin, football player 
 Lewis Massey, politician
 Micah Owings, baseball player
 Blake Sims, football player
 Tommy Valentine, golfer
 Deshaun Watson, football player
 Tommy West, football coach
 Chris Williamson, football player

External links
 Gainesville City Schools
 Gainesville High School
 Gainesville High School at Gainesville City Schools Online

References

Educational institutions established in 1892
Public high schools in Georgia (U.S. state)
Schools in Hall County, Georgia
1892 establishments in Georgia (U.S. state)